Delisle v Canada (Deputy AG), [1999] 2 SCR 989 is a Supreme Court of Canada decision on the freedom of association guarantee under section 2(d) of the Canadian Charter of Rights and Freedoms. The Court defined the freedom as only applying to individuals and not associations themselves. Accordingly, they found the exclusion of the Royal Canadian Mounted Police (RCMP) from the public services legislation did not violate section 2(d).

Gaétan Delisle was a member of the RCMP and president of an RCMP labour association. He brought a challenge to the federal Public Service Staff Relations Act (PSSRA) and part of the Canada Labour Code on the grounds it violated his right to association.

Bastarache J, writing for the majority, held that the PSSRA did not violate the Charter because it did not affect members of the RCMP from forming their own independent associations. He further ruled that, "The fundamental freedoms protected by s. 2 of the Charter do not impose a positive obligation of protection or inclusion on Parliament or the government, except perhaps in exceptional circumstances which are not at issue here."

Note that much of this case has been overruled by Health Services v BC (2007)

See also
 List of Supreme Court of Canada cases (Lamer Court)
 Dunmore v Ontario (AG) (2001)

Notes

External links
 

Canadian Charter of Rights and Freedoms case law
Supreme Court of Canada cases
1999 in Canadian case law